Indigo: Women of Song is the nineteenth studio album by British-Australian singer Olivia Newton-John. It was first released by Festival Mushroom Records on 17 October 2004 in Australia. An album of cover versions of songs previously recorded by female singers, it was entirely produced by Phil Ramone. Indigo: Women of Song peaked at number 15 on the Australian Albums Chart and was eventually certified Gold by the Australian Recording Industry Association (ARIA). In the United States, the album was issued under the title Portraits – A Tribute to Great Women of Song, featuring different artwork. The album was eventually released in Japan, 2006 under the Universal Music label.

Critical reception

AllMusic editor Jon O'Brien rated the album two and a half stars out of five, writing that "Newton-John's light and airy vocals are the perfect foil for the swooning lounge-pop" of the Burt Bacharach/David, Stephen Sondheim and Astrud Gilberto renditions on Indigo, but "her clean-cut sweetly sung tones lack the emotion to pull off" the rest of the material".

Track listing
All tracks produced by Phil Ramone.

Personnel
Performers and musicians
 Elena Barere – concertmaster (2, 4, 5, 6, 10)
 Jill Dell'Abate – orchestral contractor (New York)
 Bruce Dukov – concertmaster (1, 3, 11)
 Lisa Fischer – backing vocals (4, 7)
 Julliann French – orchestral contractor (Los Angeles)
 Scott Kreitzer – tenor saxophone (1, 4, 10)
 Rob Mathes – acoustic piano (11)
 Hendrik Meurkens – harmonica (3, 8)
 Rob Mounsey – orchestral conductor (2, 4, 5, 6, 10)
 Olivia Newton-John – lead vocals
 Brian O'Connor – French horn (11)
 Dean Parks – guitar (1, 3–8, 10)
 Shawn Pelton – drums (1–8, 10)
 Philippe Saisse – keyboards (7, 9)
 Vaneese Thomas – backing vocals (4, 7)
 Randy Waldman – keyboards, programming, arrangements, orchestral conductor (1, 3, 11)

Technical
 Jon Berkowitz – assistant engineer
 Kevin Bosley – assistant engineer
 Jill Dell'Abate – production manager
 Andrew Felluss – assistant engineer
 Ted Jensen – mastering (at Sterling Sound (New York, NY)
 Chuck Johnson – assistant engineer
 Richard Kaplan – assistant engineer
 Brian Montgomery – assistant engineer
 Joel Moss – mixing (at Shire Studios), recording
 Phil Ramone – producer
 Chad Allen Smith – design and photograph
 Jay Spears – assistant engineer
 Ed Thacker – recording
 Mark Valentine – recording

Charts

Certifications

Release history

References

2004 albums
Olivia Newton-John albums
Covers albums
albums produced by Phil Ramone